Edgar Schneider (born August 17, 1949 in Pforzheim) is a retired German football player. He spent 4 seasons in the Bundesliga with FC Bayern Munich.

Honours
 Bundesliga champion: 1972, 1973
 Bundesliga runner-up: 1971.
 DFB-Pokal winner: 1971 (scored the winning goal with 2 minutes to go in extra time).

External links
 

1949 births
Living people
German footballers
FC Bayern Munich footballers
FC Augsburg players
Bundesliga players
Association football midfielders
Sportspeople from Pforzheim
Footballers from Baden-Württemberg